In the area of mathematics known as graph theory, a tree is said to be starlike if it has exactly one vertex of degree greater than 2. This high-degree vertex is the root and a starlike tree is obtained by attaching at least three linear graphs to this central vertex.

Properties 

Two finite starlike trees are isospectral, i.e. their graph Laplacians have the same spectra, if and only if they are isomorphic.  The graph Laplacian has always only one eigenvalue equal or greater than 4.

References

External links 
 
 

Trees (graph theory)
Spectral theory